Mean Machine RFC is a Rugby union club based in Nairobi, Kenya. It is the representative side of the University of Nairobi and was founded in 1977 during the time when rugby union in Kenya was predominantly played by white settlers and expats. In their inaugural year they won the Kenya Cup. During the 1980s the club was forced to close due to political pressure after the 1982 coup d'état attempt, and many players would have to play for other clubs.

See also
Rugby union in Kenya

References

University of Nairobi
Kenyan rugby union teams